is a train station on the Nankō Port Town Line (New Tram) in Suminoe-ku, Osaka, Japan. The station services Osaka Prefectural Government Sakishima Building, the third tallest building in Japan.

Lines
 (Station Number: P10)

History
 The station opened to rail traffic on December 18, 1997, on the Osaka Port Transport System Techno Port Line.
 On July 1, 2005, Osaka Municipal Transportation Bureau took over management of the station
 On April 1, 2018, Osaka Metro took over management of the station

Layout
This station has an elevated island platform serving two tracks. The station is completely walled in with glass walls.

Surroundings
Osaka Prefectural Government Sakishima Building
Asia and Pacific Trade Center (ATC)
Osaka Nanko Cosmo Ferry Terminal
ATC O's Quay
Osaka Nanko Bird Sanctuary
Osaka Maritime Museum (closed)

Railway stations in Osaka Prefecture
Osaka Metro stations
Railway stations in Japan opened in 1997